The Fifth National Census of Population of the Dominican Republic was taken in 9-10 January 1970, during the presidency of Joaquín Balaguer.

This census collected information aspects of sex, occupation, age, fertility, religion, marital status, nationality, literacy, ability to vote and housing.

Unlike all previous censuses, no information regarding race was collected. This census was made over two days instead of one.

General results

See also 
 1920 Santo Domingo Census
 1950 Dominican Republic Census
 1960 Dominican Republic Census
 2010 Dominican Republic Census
 2022 Dominican Republic Census

Sources 
 National Bureau of Statistics (1976). Fifth National Census of Population, 1970.

References 

Censuses in the Dominican Republic
1970 in the Dominican Republic
Dominican Republic